POTA may refer to:

Planet of the Apes (disambiguation)
Rafael Cordero Santiago Port of the Americas
Prevention of Terrorism Act, 2002, an Act passed by the Parliament of India
Prevention of Terrorism Act 2005, an Act of the Parliament of the United Kingdom
Parks On The Air (Amateur Radio activity)

See also 
 Pota, a village in India